Werauhia sanguinolenta is a plant species in the genus Werauhia. The species is native to Colombia.

Cultivars
 Werauhia 'Edna Shiigi'

References

BSI Cultivar Registry Retrieved 11 October 2009

Flora of Colombia
sanguinolenta
Taxa named by Alfred Cogniaux